The 10 cm houfnice vz. 30 (howitzer model 30) was a Czechoslovak howitzer used in the Second World War. The 158 weapons captured after the German invasion of Czechoslovakia in March 1939 were taken into Wehrmacht service as the 10 cm leFH 30(t). It was used by a variety of German units during World War II, including II. and III./SS-Artillerie-Abteilung 3 between 1939 and 1940 and SS-Artillerie-Abteilung 51 during 1941. 30 served with the Slovak Army.

Design and history
It was modified from an earlier Skoda design, the 10 cm houfnice vz. 28, that attempted to combine the field and mountain gun roles into one weapon. The Czechoslovak army decided to adopt it to replace their plethora of aged Austro-Hungarian field guns. They replaced the wheels with modern rubber-tired wheels, but curiously chose to retain the crewman's seat on the gun shield. It used the same carriage as the 8 cm kanon vz. 30 that could break down into three pieces for transport. It fired a  shell.

Notes

References
 Engelmann, Joachim and Scheibert, Horst. Deutsche Artillerie 1934-1945: Eine Dokumentation in Text, Skizzen und Bildern: Ausrüstung, Gliederung, Ausbildung, Führung, Einsatz. Limburg/Lahn, Germany: C. A. Starke, 1974
 Gander, Terry and Chamberlain, Peter. Weapons of the Third Reich: An Encyclopedic Survey of All Small Arms, Artillery and Special Weapons of the German Land Forces 1939-1945. New York: Doubleday, 1979 
 Kliment, Charles K. and Nakládal, Bretislav. Germany's First Ally: Armed Forces of the Slovak State 1939-1945. Atglen, PA: Schiffer, 1997

External links
 page on the two vz. 30 weapons

World War II artillery of Germany
World War II field artillery
Artillery of Czechoslovakia
100 mm artillery